Ashridge Executive Education (also known as the Ashridge Programme or Ashridge) is the executive education programme of Hult International Business School, housed in Hult's Ashridge Estate campus. Formerly an independent business school, known as Ashridge Business School, Ashridge completed an operational merger with Hult in 2015. Its activities include open and tailored executive education programmes, Master of Business Administration, Master of Science and diploma qualifications, as well as organisation consulting and applied research.

History
The college was conceived at Ashridge House in 1921, when the house was acquired by a trust established by Bonar Law, a future UK Prime Minister; in 1929 it became a  "College of Citizenship", established to help the Conservative Party develop its intellectual forces in struggles with left-wing organisations such as the Fabian Society. It became a cross between a think-tank and a training centre and had Arthur Bryant as its educational adviser.

After the Second World War, the "College of Citizenship" was briefly re-established but in 1959 it was re-launched with a new focus on management training, taking the name Ashridge Management College.

In 2015 the then Ashridge Business School operationally merged with Hult International Business School, an international business school with campuses in seven cities around the world. As part of the merger, Ashridge Business School changed its name to Ashridge Executive Education.

Campus 
The Ashridge programme is based at Ashridge House, one of the largest Gothic Revival country houses in the United Kingdom. The school has a number of representatives in Europe and throughout the world, including in Denmark, Germany, Norway, Sweden, China, India, United Arab Emirates, North America and the Benelux countries.

Organization and administration

Constitution
Ashridge Business School is constituted as a registered charity, formally named the Ashridge (Bonar Law Memorial) Trust, and is one of the 150 largest UK charitable organisations ranked by annual expenditure. The trust has the following goals: (a) honouring the memory of a great statesman, (b) the preservation of the house and grounds as an historic building, (c) to create an educational centre (d) to train lecturers, speakers and writers to further the study of the subjects outlined above (e) provide lectures and/or discussions on these subjects open to the public or for those who had paid fees to attend, (f) provide a supporting staff, (g) to allow boarding by those attending the lectures and discussions.

Faculty
Ashridge employs approximately 95 full-time academic staff and has a further 100 associate faculty members. Faculty members are not traditional academics – the majority combine significant academic qualifications with extensive international business experience, enabling them to become fully involved with the issues and challenges faced by clients and individual participants. Academic staff regularly serve on the councils of international educational and advisory bodies, including the Graduate Management Admission Council (GMAC), European Foundation for Management Development (EFMD) and Association of MBAs (AMBA). They also share their expertise as visiting professors at many international business schools and universities.

Academics
In the Financial Times rankings (May 2014) for custom and open programmes, Ashridge was ranked in the top 25 (23rd) in the world.
Ashridge is the only UK specialist business school with degree-awarding powers, giving it the equivalent status to a university in awarding its degrees. Ashridge's Academic Accreditation service provides a route for other educational institutions to work with Ashridge in offering degree-level qualifications in business and management.

Research centres
Ashridge has six research centres, each carrying out specific research and providing consultancy services and specialised programmes including Ashridge Centre for Business and Sustainability, Ashridge Centre for Coaching, Ashridge Leadership Centre, Ashridge Strategic Management Centre, Centre for Research in Executive Development, Ashridge Centre for Action Research.

See also
 Ashridge
 Ashridge Priory

References

Further reading
 Sanecki, K.A., Ashridge – A Living History, Phillimore & Co, 1996,

External links
Ashridge Business School 

Hult International Business School
Business schools in England
Educational institutions established in 1959
1959 establishments in England
Ashridge
Little Gaddesden